Ectomis labriaris is a Neotropical species of skippers in the subfamily Eudaminae. It is found in Brazil (Amazonas, Bahia).

References

Hesperiidae